Abū al-Walīd ‘Abd Allāh ibn Muḥammad ibn Yūsuf ibn Naṣr ibn al-Faraḍī al-Azdī al-Qurṭubī             , (21 December 962 – 20 April 1013) best known as Ibn al-Faraḍī, was an Andalusian historian, chiefly known for his Tarikh ulama al-Andalus, a biographical dictionary about religious scholars from al-Andalus. He was a faqīh (jurist) and a muhaddith (scholar of hadith).

Life
Ibn al-Faraḍī began his studies in religious sciences in his native city of Córdoba, and continued them in Toledo, Écija, and Medina-Sidonia. Among his many of his well-known tutors were Ibn Awn Allāh (d. 988), Abū ‘Abd Allāh ibn Mufarrij (d. 990), ‘Abd Allāh ibn Qāsim al-Thagrī (d. 993), and Abū Zakariyya ibn Aidh            (d. 985). In the early 990s, he travelled to the East and pursued his studies in Kairouan, Cairo, Mecca and Medina. On his return to al-Andalus, Ibn al-Faradi was appointed as a qadi ("religious judge") in Valencia. He had several pupils, including Ibn Hayyan, Ibn 'Abd al-Barr, and Ibn Hazm. He was killed in Córdoba on 20 April 1013 during the Fitna of al-Andalus.

References

Sources
 
 

962 births
1013 deaths
10th-century historians from al-Andalus
10th-century biographers
10th-century jurists
11th-century historians from al-Andalus
11th-century biographers
11th-century jurists
Scholars from al-Andalus
Encyclopedists of the medieval Islamic world
People from Córdoba, Spain